Gregory Calbi (born April 3, 1949) is an American mastering engineer at Sterling Sound, New Jersey.

Biography
Greg Calbi was born on April 3, 1949, in Yonkers, New York, and raised in Bayside, Queens, New York. He graduated in 1966 from Bishop Reilly High School in Fresh Meadows. Calbi earned his bachelor's degree in Mass Communications at Fordham University where he studied with Marshall McLuhan and his staff for 3 of those years.  He then earned his master's degree in Political Media Studies (Speech Department) at the University of Massachusetts.  During these college years, Calbi drove a NYC cab and sold ladies shoes, and was intent on becoming a documentary filmmaker.  However, Calbi was asked by someone who worked at the Record Plant to drive a truck to Duke University to record Yes on the Close to the Edge Tour and soon after that began his career in 1972 as an assistant studio engineer at the Record Plant, working alongside engineers Jack Douglas, Jay Messina and Shelly Yakus, and Jimmy Iovine who was an assistant engineer at that time. In two years, Calbi began cutting vinyl in the mastering room with his high school and college friend, Tom Rabstenek, who had taken over The Cutting Room when George Marino left to go to Sterling Sound. During this time, Calbi helped Tom cut the lacquers for Stevie Wonder's Innervisions among others from the notes that George had left. In his first year as a mastering engineer, Calbi mastered his first platinum record, Eric Carmen by Eric Carmen, John Lennon's Walls and Bridges and in 1975, Calbi mastered David Bowie's Young Americans and Bruce Springsteen's Born to Run. Calbi worked at the Record Plant until 1976 when a position was offered to him by Lee Hulko, owner of Sterling Sound.

During his early years at Sterling, Calbi worked alongside Lee Hulko, George Marino and Ted Jensen, and became known for mastering punk classics for The Ramones, Talking Heads and Patti Smith, as well as Tom Petty, Bill Frisell, Aretha Franklin and Todd Rundgren among others. In 1994, Calbi left Sterling for Masterdisk where he worked until 1998 when Calbi, Ted Jensen and Tom Coyne, along with Murat Aktar (Absolute Audio co-founder) and UK based Metropolis, purchased Sterling Sound from Lee Hulko.

Awards and nominations
TEC Awards

Calbi has garnered 12 Mix Foundation TEC Award nominations for Creative Achievement, winning two of them.

|-
|2007
|Waiting on the World to Change
|Record Production/Single or Track
|
|-
|2007
|Continuum
|Record Production, Album
|

Selected works
Calbi has mastered over 7500 albums during his career; a list of noteworthy music Calbi has mastered includes:

 1973 Feeling the Space – Yoko Ono/Plastic Ono Band
  1973 Berlin – Lou Reed
  1973 Witness – Spooky Tooth
  1973 Unbonded - The Chambers Brothers
  1974 Pussy Cats – Harry Nilsson
  1974 Hard Labor – Three Dog Night
  1974 Kansas – Kansas
  1974 Starting Over – Raspberries
  1974 Eric Carmen – Eric Carmen
  1974 Walls and Bridges – John Lennon
  1974 Blood on the Tracks – Bob Dylan
  1974 Inseparable – Natalie Cole
  1975 Teaser – Tommy Bolin
  1975 Rock 'n' Roll – John Lennon
  1975 Born to Run – Bruce Springsteen
  1975 Jasmine Nightdreams – Edgar Winter
  1975 Go Girl Crazy! – The Dictators
  1975 New City – Blood, Sweat & Tears
  1975 On Your Feet or on Your Knees – Blue Öyster Cult
  1975 Young Americans – David Bowie
  1976 Yesterday and Today – Y&T
  1976 Greatest Stories Live – Harry Chapin
  1976 Blondie – Blondie
  1976 Solo – Don McLean
  1976 Dedication – Bay City Rollers
  1976 Night Shift – Foghat
  1976 Ramones – Ramones
  1976 Images – Dan Hartman
  1976 Captured Live! – Johnny Winter
  1976 Even in the Quietest Moments – Supertramp
  1977 Hard Again – Muddy Waters
  1977 38 Special – 38 Special
  1977 Low – David Bowie
  1977 The Geese & the Ghost – Anthony Phillips
  1977 Marquee Moon – Television
  1977 Rocket to Russia – Ramones
  1977 Beauty on a Back Street – Hall & Oates
  1977 On Stage – Rainbow
  1977 Nothin' but the Blues – Johnny Winter
  1977 "Heroes" – David Bowie
  1977 Lust for Life – Iggy Pop
  1977 Blank Generation – Richard Hell and the Voidoids
  1977 Go Too – Go
  1978 Road to Ruin – Ramones
  1978 White, Hot and Blue – Johnny Winter
  1978 Meco Plays The Wizard of Oz – Meco
  1978 Special Delivery – 38 Special
  1978 David Johansen – David Johansen
  1978 Sayin' It with Love – Steve Camp
  1978 Grab It for a Second – Golden Earring
  1978 Symphony of Love – Miquel Brown
  1978 Easter – Patti Smith Group
  1978 The Godz – The Godz
  1978 All Mod Cons – The Jam
  1978 Plastic Letters – Blondie
  1978 Cosmic Messenger – Jean-Luc Ponty
  1978 I'm Ready – Muddy Waters
  1978 Elements – Roger Glover
  1978 Breakfast in America – Supertramp
  1979 Lodger – David Bowie
  1979 Setting Sons – The Jam
  1979 Damn the Torpedoes – Tom Petty and the Heartbreakers
  1979 Do It Yourself – Ian Dury and The Blockheads
  1979 Down to Earth – Rainbow
  1979 A Taste for Passion – Jean-Luc Ponty
  1979 TRB Two – Tom Robinson Band
  1979 Electric Dreams – John McLaughlin
  1979 Journey to the Land Of... Enchantment – Enchantment
  1979 Superman & Other Galactic Heroes – Meco
  1979 Alchemy – Richard Lloyd
  1979 Fear of Music – Talking Heads
  1980 Making Movies – Dire Straits
  1980 Sugarhill Gang – The Sugarhill Gang
  1980 Beauty and the Beat – Go-Go's
  1980 Scissors Cut – Art Garfunkel
  1980 Willie Nile – Willie Nile
  1980 Remain in Light – Talking Heads
  1980 Growing Up in Public – Lou Reed
  1981 Concert in Central Park – Simon & Garfunkel
  1981 Forever, for Always, for Love – Luther Vandross
  1982 The Ever Popular Tortured Artist Effect – Todd Rundgren
  1982 Mesopotamia – The B-52's
  1982 The Blue Mask – Lou Reed
  1983 Close to the Bone – Tom Tom Club
  1983 Faster Than the Speed of Night – Bonnie Tyler
  1983 Colour by Numbers – Culture Club
  1983 Legendary Hearts – Lou Reed
  1983 Murmur – R.E.M.
  1983 Hearts and Bones – Paul Simon
  1984 Human's Lib – Howard Jones
  1984 Footloose – Original Soundtrack
  1984 Feeling Cavalier – Ebn Ozn
  1984 Milk and Honey – John Lennon/Yoko Ono
  1984 Serious Business – Johnny Winter
  1984 Suzanne Vega – Suzanne Vega
  1984 Who's Zoomin' Who? – Aretha Franklin
  1984 Perfect Strangers – Deep Purple  
  1985 7800° Fahrenheit – Bon Jovi
  1986 Graceland – Paul Simon
  1987 Before We Were Born – Bill Frisell
  1987 Crossroads – Eric Clapton
  1988 State of Euphoria – Anthrax
  1988 Ramones Mania – Ramones
  1988 Vivid – Living Colour
  1989 Force Majeure – Doro
  1989 Let Love Rule – Lenny Kravitz
  1990 Paul Simon's Concert in the Park – Paul Simon
  1991 Attack of the Killer B's – Anthrax
  1991 The Human Factor – Metal Church
  1991 Mama Said – Lenny Kravitz
  1992  Gordon – Barenaked Ladies
  1992 Over My Heart – Laura Branigan
  1993 Fumbling Towards Ecstasy – Sarah McLachlan
  1994 Pearls – David Sanborn
  1994 Wild Onions – Jeff Greene
  1995 New Moon Daughter – Cassandra Wilson
  1996 Songs from the Night Before – David Sanborn
  1996 Flaming Pie – Paul McCartney
  1997 Gone, Just Like a Train – Bill Frisell
  1997 Rant and Roar – Great Big Sea
  1998 Chasin' Gus' Ghost – John Sebastian & the J Band
  1998 God Save the Smithereens – The Smithereens
  1998 Mirrorball – Sarah McLachlan
  1999 Life'll Kill You – Warren Zevon
  2000 The Sophtware Slump – Grandaddy
  2000 Live at Red Rocks – Rickie Lee Jones
  2000 Songs in Red and Gray – Suzanne Vega
  2001 Lost in Space – Aimee Mann
  2001 Is This It – The Strokes
  2001 Look into the Eyeball – David Byrne
  2002 Holy Roller Novocaine – Kings of Leon
  2002 Future Kings of Spain – Future Kings of Spain
  2002 It Still Moves – My Morning Jacket
  2002 Turn On The Bright Lights – Interpol
  2002 Stumble into Grace – Emmylou Harris
  2003 The Battle for Everything – Five for Fighting
  2003 Legs to Make Us Longer – Kaki King
  2005 Boys and Girls in America – The Hold Steady
 2005 Gimme Fiction - Spoon
 2006 Continuum – John Mayer
  2006 Grand Central – Jeff Golub
  2007 Here & Gone – David Sanborn 
  2008 Day Old Belgian Blues – Kings of Leon
  2008 The Fall – Norah Jones
  2008 Popular Songs – Yo La Tengo
  2008 Never Going Back – Shemekia Copeland
  2008  Bachelite – Offlaga Disco Pax 
  2009 Fuerza Natural – Gustavo Cerati
  2009 Just Across the River – Jimmy Webb
  2009 Memories of You – Bette Midler
  2009 Of the Blue Colour of the Sky – OK Go
  2010 Blood/Candy – The Posies
  2010 Innerspeaker – Tame Impala
  2010 Industrial Silence – Madrugada
  2010 Bon Iver – Bon Iver
  2010 The Devil's Rain – Misfits
  2010 Fixin' to Die – G. Love
  2010 Go-Go Boots – Drive-By Truckers
  2010 Ramble at the Ryman – Levon Helm
  2011 Boys & Girls – Alabama Shakes
  2012 Lonerism – Tame Impala
  2012 Four MFs Playin' Tunes – Branford Marsalis Quartet
  2012 Fade – Yo La Tengo
  2012 Traveler – Trey Anastasio
  2012 All the Little Lights – Passenger
  2013 American Ride – Willie Nile
  2013 Save Rock and Roll – Fall Out Boy
  2013 Mosquito – Yeah Yeah Yeahs
  2013 Big Sur – Bill Frisell
  2013 Quartette Humaine – Bob James and David Sanborn
  2013 In the Wake – Tea Leaf Green
  2013 Trouble Will Find Me – The National
  2013 Birth in Reverse – St. Vincent 
  2013 The Blessed Unrest – Sara Bareilles
  2014 Cheek to Cheek – Lady Gaga & Tony Bennett
  2014 Hungry Ghosts – OK Go
  2014 If I Was a River – Willie Nile
  2014 Too Bright – Perfume Genius
  2014 Brill Bruisers – The New Pornographers
  2015 No Cities to Love – Sleater-Kinney
  2015 Chasing Yesterday – Noel Gallagher's High Flying Birds
  2015 In Extremis – Francis Cabrel 
  2015 Space Is Still the Place – The Bright Light Social Hour
  2015 Strangers to Ourselves – Modest Mouse
  2015 Currents – Tame Impala
  2015 Dualidad – 
  2016 Give a Glimpse of What Yer Not – Dinosaur Jr.
  2016 Stranger to Stranger – Paul Simon
  2016 Why Are You OK – Band of Horses
  2016 American Football – American Football
  2016 Chapter and Verse – Bruce Springsteen
  2016 Day Breaks – Norah Jones
  2016 Fallen Angels – Bob Dylan
  2016 Painting of a Panic Attack – Frightened Rabbit
  2016 Valse Hot – Sweet Basil 1978 – Jim Hall and Red Mitchell
  2017 A-ha – MTV Unplugged: Summer Solstice
2017 Arcade Fire – Everything Now
2017 Bob Dylan – Triplicate (Bob Dylan album)
2017 Pond (Australian band) - The Weather (Pond album)
2017 Cigarettes After Sex – Cigarettes After Sex (album)
2017 Fleet Foxes – Crack-Up
2017 Foster the People – Sacred Hearts Club
2017 John Mayer – The Search for Everything
2017 The National (band) – Sleep Well Beast
2017 The New Pornographers – Whiteout Conditions
2017 The War on Drugs (band) – A Deeper Understanding
2017 Valerie June – The Order of Time (album)
2018 MGMT - Little Dark Age
2018 Big Red Machine (band) – Big Red Machine (album)
2018 David Byrne – American Utopia
2018 Interpol (band) – Marauder
2018 Kacey Musgraves – Golden Hour
2018 Kimbra – Primal Heart
2018 Ought – Room Inside the World
2019 Bon Iver – I, I
2019 Joe Jackson (musician) – Fool
2019 The National (band) – I Am Easy to Find (album)
2020 Tame Impala – The Slow Rush
2022 Adam Trumbo – Modern Communication
2022 Joshua Redman – LongGone 
2023 Lil Yachty – Let's Start Here.
Catalog Remastering Highlights:

 1988 Crossroads – Eric Clapton
 2010 Signature Box – John Lennon
 2012 Dual Layer DSD/PCM 15 Album Catalog Box set – Bob Dylan
 2014 The U.S. Albums  – The Beatles
 2014 Start Together – Sleater-Kinney
 2014 OT Remasters – 11 albums, 1 DVD – Tamio Okuda
 2015 Crime of the Century – Supertramp

References

1949 births
Living people
Mastering engineers
People from Yonkers, New York
American music people
Grammy Award winners